Philip Ponder (born February 27, 1997) is an American-born-Taiwanese football player.

Playing career

Youth & College
Ponder played with the FC Dallas academy from 2010, before playing college soccer at Southern Methodist University in 2016, where he played for four years. During his time with the Mustangs, Ponder made 50 appearances, scoring 5 goals and tallying a single assist. He was also named the AAC All-Academic Team (2016–17, 2017–18, 2018–19), AAC All-Tournament Team (2018), CoSIDA Third Team Academic All-American (2017), as well as winning two AAC Defensive Player of the Week awards.

North Texas SC
On January 14, 2020, Ponder signed with North Texas SC, the USL League One affiliate of FC Dallas. He made his professional debut on August 8, 2020, appearing as an 84th-minute substitute during a 2–2 draw with Chattanooga Red Wolves. On November 30, 2020, Ponder was released by North Texas.

International
Ponder made three appearances and scored a single goal for the Chinese Taipei U23 team during the 2020 Summer Olympics qualifiers in 2019.

International goals

Chinese Taipei U23

References 

1997 births
American soccer players
Association football defenders
FC Dallas players
Living people
North Texas SC players
SMU Mustangs men's soccer players
Soccer players from Texas
Sportspeople from Arlington, Texas
Taiwanese expatriate footballers
Taiwanese footballers
USL League One players